Yoon Hee-jun (윤희준, born November 1, 1972]) is a South Korean footballer.

Career 
He played for Busan IPark and Jeonnam Dragons. 

He is currently FC Seoul coach since 2017 season.

References

External links

1972 births
Living people
South Korean footballers
Busan IPark players
Jeonnam Dragons players
FC Seoul non-playing staff
K League 1 players
Yonsei University alumni
Association football defenders